The Autonomic Insignia of Valour is the second highest honor awarded by the Regional Government of Madeira, which “aims to distinguish, in life or posthumously, citizens, communities or institutions that stand out for personal or institutional merits, acts, acts services rendered to the Region ”.

The insignia were established through Regional Legislative Decree n. 21/2003/M of 13 August and regulated by Regional Regulatory Decree n. 9/2004/M of 12 April.

Its attribution is decided by deliberation of the Council of the Regional Government, after receiving proposals of any member of the Regional Government or of any member of the Regional Legislative Assembly.

Purpose 
According to Article 4 of Regional Legislative Decree no. 21/2003/M, the Autonomic Insignia of Valour is to be bestowed to those who had:

 Exceptionally relevant performance in positions in the organs of self-government, regional public administration or in the service of the Region, and which deserve special distinction;
 Professional performance and virtues, deserving to be worthy of public respect and consideration.

Awarding 
The insignia is usually award on the first of July, Madeira's regional holiday.

References 

Madeira Island
Orders, decorations, and medals of Portugal
Awards established in 2003
2003 establishments in Portugal